The Shaheed Minar (English: Martyrs' Monument), formerly known as the Ochterlony Monument, is a monument in Kolkata that was erected in 1828 in memory of Major-general Sir David Ochterlony, commander of the British East India Company, to commemorate both his successful defense of Delhi against the Marathas in 1804 and the victory of the East India Company’s armed forces over the Gurkhas in the Anglo-Nepalese War, also known as the Gurkha War. The monument was constructed in his memory. It was designed by J.P. Parker and paid for from public funds.

On 9 August 1969, it was rededicated to the memory of the martyrs of the Indian freedom movement and renamed the "Shaheed Minar," which means "martyrs' monument" in both Bengali and Hindi, by the then United Front Government in memory of the martyrs of the Indian independence movement. The present government has decided to illuminate the tower during evenings and allow visitors to the top. The last people to have been up there were former governor Gopal Krishna Gandhi and his family.

Features

Known as the "Cloud kissing Monument" by Mark Twain, the Shaheed Minar is located at Esplanade in Central Kolkata in the north-east facet of the Maidan. It has a foundation based on the Egyptian style. The column is a combination of styles with a classical fluted column, a Syrian upper portion, and a Turkish dome. It has two balconies at the top. The top floor of the minar is accessible by a serpentine staircase, a total of 223 steps. It has a total of 218 steps until the top of the tower.

The monument was erected by Burn & Company.

Shaheed Minar Maidan
The vast field to the south of Shaheed Minar, is known as the Shaheed Minar Maidan or the Brigade Ground. It has a history of being the site of political rallies and fairs. The first political meeting on the ground was presided over by Rabindranath Tagore to condemn the killing of a youth in Hijli by the British in 1931. The central bus terminus of the city is around the monument.

Public use

In 1997, a tourist jumped off the lower balcony of the monument. Since then, police permission is required to climb the steps of the monument. Local residents must submit proof of address and a photo ID at the Lalbazar Police Headquarters, while out-of-town tourists must submit documents from their hotel, and foreigners must submit a copy of their passport.

The monument offers a bird's-eye view of the city. The government has planned to open the monument to the public, after the renovation work is completed. The renovation work was started in late 2011 and will be completed in two phases. The first phase was scheduled to be completed by June 15, 2012, and is said to cost about 50lakhs. There are also plans to illuminate the monument, both from inside and outside, and to give the monument a fresh coat of paint.

After the work is completed, both tourists and locals will have access to the top of the monument. Stalls selling souvenirs will also be set up just in front of the monument, while the pathways leading to it will be cleaned and decorated with flowering plants.

Gallery

References

External links

Towers in India
Monuments and memorials in Kolkata
Martyrs' monuments and memorials
Indian military memorials and cemeteries